Žarnovica District is a district in
the Banská Bystrica Region of central Slovakia. Until 1918, the district was mostly part of the county of Kingdom of Hungary of Tekov, only a part of Hodruša-Hámre, namely Banská Hodruša in the east was part of Banská Štiavnica, an urban county on the territory of Hont County.

Municipalities 
Brehy
Hodruša-Hámre
Horné Hámre
Hrabičov
Hronský Beňadik
Kľak
Malá Lehota
Nová Baňa
Orovnica
Ostrý Grúň
Píla
Rudno nad Hronom
Tekovská Breznica
Veľká Lehota
Veľké Pole
Voznica
Žarnovica
Župkov

Districts of Slovakia
Geography of Banská Bystrica Region